Mertcan Demirer (born 14 March 1993 in Kadıköy) is a Turkish professional footballer who plays as a midfielder for Kars 36 Spor.

Life and career
Demirer began his career with Beşiktaş J.K. in 2006.  He made his professional debut on 21 May 2011 against Gaziantepspor replacing Rıdvan Şimşek.

References
 http://www.tff.org/Default.aspx?pageId=526&kisiId=900576
 http://www.tff.org/Default.aspx?pageId=528&macId=87205
 

1993 births
Living people
People from Kadıköy
Footballers from Istanbul
Turkish footballers
Turkey youth international footballers
TFF First League players
TKİ Tavşanlı Linyitspor footballers
Association football midfielders